The Hezbollah Assembly or Assembly of Hezbollah was a parliamentary group in the Iranian Parliament between 1996 and 2000. 

It has been described as "a moderate grouping of legislative members positioned in the counterpoint of Hezbollah [fraction]" and  a "parliamentary alliance" between the modernist right and the Islamic left. 

Its leader was Abdollah Nouri, who was later succeeded by Majid Ansari.

Political position 
It was founded in 1996 mainly by the candidates included in the electoral list of the right-wing Executives of Construction, which according to Banks et al., is believed to have won 90 to 100 seats. Mojahedin of the Islamic Revolution of Iran Organization was the another major group in the parliamentary group with some 30 seats, according to Wilfried Buchta. Members of the Worker House were also in the parliamentary group.

The group was supportive of Akbar Hashemi Rafsanjani and endorsed Mohammad Khatami in his successful bid for 1997 Iranian presidential election, before declaring their support for candidacy of Mir-Hossein Mousavi.

References 

Iranian Parliament fractions
1996 establishments in Iran
2000 disestablishments in Iran
5th legislature of the Islamic Republic of Iran